The Russian Orthodox Church is traditionally said to have been founded by Andrew the Apostle, who is thought to have visited Scythia and Greek colonies along the northern coast of the Black Sea. According to one of the legends, St. Andrew reached the future location of Kiev and foretold the foundation of a great Christian city. The spot where he reportedly erected a cross is now marked by St. Andrew's Cathedral.

Christianization of the Rus
The Church of Constantinople's greatest mission outreach was to a medieval state known as Kievan Rus whose territories are now within Belarus, Ukraine, and Russia. Christianity was introduced into Kievan Rus by Greek missionaries from the Byzantine Empire in the 9th century. In 863–869, Saint Cyril and Saint Methodius translated parts of the Bible into the Old Church Slavonic language for the first time, paving the way for the Christianization of the Slavs. There is evidence that the first Christian bishop was sent to Novgorod from Constantinople either by Patriarch Photius or Patriarch Ignatius, circa 866-867 AD.

By the mid-10th century, there was already a Christian community amongst Kievan nobility, under the leadership of Greek and Byzantine priests, although paganism remained and would long remain the dominant religion. Princess Olga of Kiev was the first ruler of Kievan Rus to convert to Christianity, either in 945 or 957.

The Kievan church was originally a metropolitanate of the Patriarchate of Constantinople and the Ecumenical patriarch, along with the Emperor, appointed the metropolitan who governed the Church of Rus'. The Metropolitan's residence was originally located in Kiev. As Kiev was losing its political significance due to the Mongol invasion, Metropolitan Maximus moved to new centre of power Vladimir in 1299; his successors, Metropolitan Peter and Theognostus, moved the residence to Moscow in the 14th century.

In 1054, the Great Schism occurred, and Russian church ceased to be in communion with the Pope.

Under Mongol rule
The Russian church enjoyed a favoured position while parts of Russia lay under Mongol rule from the 13th-15th century. Sergius, as well as the metropolitans St. Peter (1308–26) and St. Alexius (1354–78), supported the rising power of the principality of Moscow. The church enjoyed protection for its land and buildings as well as freedom from taxes. In addition it was guaranteed freedom from persecution in accordance with Islamic religious law. To that extent, there was even a legal relationship between the Golden Horde and the Russian Orthodox Church since these rights had been conceded in a formal document (jarlig). The church was only required to pray for the Khan. This continuation of the "symphony" corresponded with the Orthodox idea of a state that protected the Orthodox Church and, therefore could call for loyalty. Centuries later, the ecumenical patriarchs dealt hardly differently with the Ottoman rulers. In 1261, the Russian church established an eparchy in Sarai, the capital of the Golden Horde. The increasing importance of Moscow and the growing power of the political system also created ideas that contributed to a theological basis of the stature of Moscow. References have already been made regarding the perception of Moscow as a Third Rome. From that moment the sources began to use more the notion Tsarstvo, tsardom, representing a translation of the Greek basileia. The metropolitan of Moscow, Makariy (1483–1563) contributed above all, to the strengthened emphasis of the Moscow idea of the state. He emphasized the Russian ecclesiastical tradition. He made brief readings available, Menaions, which were arranged according to the calendar so that they could be read continuously in the liturgy and in the monasteries. These had strong Russian features and supported a providential view of the Russian political system.

15th century

During the 15th century the Russian Church was pivotal in the survival and life of the Russian state. Such holy figures as Sergius of Radonezh and Metropolitan Alexis helped the country to withstand years of Tartar oppression, and to expand both economically and spiritually.

At the Council of Florence 1439, a group of Orthodox leaders agreed upon terms of reunification with Rome. The Moscow Prince Vasily II, however, rejected Florence's concessions to Rome and forbade the proclamation of the acts of the Council in Moscow in 1452. Metropolitan Isidore, who had signed the Council's acts, was expelled from his position for apostasy in the same year.

In 1448, the Russian Church in Moscow became effectively independent from the Patriarchate of Constantinople, when the Russian bishops in Moscow elected their own primate, Jonas, a Russian bishop, without recourse to Constantinople. The Russian church within the bounds of the Grand Duchy of Moscow was thenceforth effectively autocephalous.

Metropolitan Jonas, like his predecessors, was given the title of Metropolitan of Kiev and All Rus', but his successors styled themselves as Metropolitans of Moscow and All Rus'. Five years later, Constantinople fell to the Ottoman Turks. Afterwards, the Russian Church and the Duchy of Moscow (later the Russian Tsardom) saw Moscow as the Third Rome, legitimate successor to Constantinople, and the metropolitan of Moscow as head of the Russian Church.

Changes and reforms

The reign of Ivan III and his successor was plagued by numerous heresies and controversies. One party, led by Nil Sorsky and Vassian Kosoy, called for secularisation of monastic properties. They were oppugned by the influential Joseph of Volotsk, who defended ecclesiastical ownership of land and property. The sovereign's position fluctuated, but eventually he threw his support to Joseph. New sects sprang up, some of which showed a tendency to revert to Mosaic law: for instance, the archpriest Aleksei converted to Judaism after meeting a certain Zechariah the Jew.

Monastic life flourished, with two major strands co-existing until the definitive defeat of the non-possessors in 1551. The disciples of St. Sergius left the Trinity monastery near Moscow to found dozens of monasteries across northeastern Russia. Some of the most famous monasteries were located in the Russian North, in order to demonstrate how faith could flourish in the most inhospitable lands. The richest landowners of medieval Russia included Joseph Volokolamsk Monastery, Kirillo-Belozersky Monastery and the Solovetsky Monastery. In the 18th century, the three greatest monasteries were recognized as lavras, while those subordinated directly to the Synod were labelled stauropegic.

In the 1540s, Metropolitan Macarius convened a number of church councils, which culminated in the Hundred Chapter Council of 1551. This assembly unified Church ceremonies and duties in the whole territory of Russia. At the demand of the Church hierarchy the government canceled the tsar's jurisdiction over ecclesiastics.

Autocephaly and reorganization
During the reign of Tsar Fyodor I, his brother-in-law Boris Godunov, who was effectively running the government, contacted the Ecumenical Patriarch, who "was much embarrassed for want of funds", with a view to elevating the status of the Moscow Metroplis to a patriarchate. Eventually, after protracted negotiations, in January 1589 the Moscow Patriarchate was established, making Metropolitan Job the first Patriarch of Moscow and all Rus'. During the next half a century, when the tsardom was weak, the patriarchs (notably Germogen and Philaret) would run the state along with (and sometimes instead of) the Tsars.

17th century
The beginning of the 17th century proved to be a troublesome period for the Moscow state, following the death of the last Tsar of the Rurik Dynasty, Feodor Ivanovich, in 1598. The Poles and Swedes repeatedly invaded Russia from the west, with the Polish prince Władysław Vasa elected the Russian Tsar by the Seven Boyars in 1610. At this time of political turmoil, Patriarch Germogen (1606–1612), proved to be a staunch opponent of the Seven Boyars as well as any Catholic pretender to the Moscow throne. That period also saw the Trinity Monastery (the modern Trinity Lavra of St. Sergius) withstanding months of a siege by a hostile force.

Schism of the Old Believers

The year 1666 saw the start of the schism of the Old Believers, who broke away from the established Church in protest against ecclesiastical reforms of Patriarch Nikon. An ambitious figure, who dreamt of celebrating liturgy in Hagia Sophia in Constantinople, Patriarch Nikon, sought to establish the primacy of the Orthodox Church over the state in Russia. In 1666-1667, he undertook a revision of translations of liturgical texts (from Greek to Church Slavonic) and some Moscow-specific rituals to bring them into accord with the prevalent practice of the Greek Church of the day. Tsar Aleksey, who was initially a close friend of Nikon, upheld the Patriarch's initiatives. The ensuing Raskol saw harsh persecution of such Old Believers' figures as Protopope Avvakum, Boyarynya Morozova and many others.

The schism peaked in 1666 when Nikon was deposed but the Moscow Church endorsed his reforms and anathematized those who continued to oppose them. The Old Believers had formed a vigorous body of dissenters within the Russian Orthodoxy for the next two centuries.

Territorial expansion
In the late 17th and the next two centuries, due to the expansion of the boundaries of the Russian state, the Russian Church experienced phenomenal geographic expansion too.

In 1686, the Moscow Patriarchate obtained a part of the Metropolis of Kiev, which until then comprised the Orthodox population on the Polish–Lithuanian Commonwealth, — from the Patriarchate of Constantinople, although the exact terms and conditions of the handover is a contested issue. In November 1685, Gedeon Chetvertinsky was installed as the Metropolitan of Kiev, Galicia and all Rus' by Patriarch Joachim of Moscow; this act was recognized by Patriarch Dionysius IV of Constantinople the following year. His title, privileges, and status were subsequently greatly reduced.

Following the incorporation of Georgia into Russia in the early 19th century, the de facto independence that the Orthodox Church had enjoyed in that country was abolished in 1811 and the Georgian Church became an exarchate of the Russian Church.

In the 19th century, there were missionary efforts in Russia's possessions in North America, as well as in Japan and China, by efforts of such figures as Innocent of Alaska, Nicholas of Japan, and Innocent (Figurovsky) of Beijing. The Japanese mission was the most successful, reaching about 35,000 baptized members in 1914.

Abolition of patriarchy and the Holy Synod
In 1700, upon the death of Patriarch Adrian, Peter I prevented a successor from being named.  In 1721, following the advice of Feofan Prokopovich, the patriarchate of Moscow was replaced with the Most Holy Governing Synod to govern the church. The Holy Governing Synod was modeled after the state-controlled synods of the Lutheran Church of Sweden and in Prussia and was tightly intertwined with the state. The Synod remained the supreme church body in the Russian Church for almost two centuries.

In 1762 Peter III made an attempt to secularize all church land and serfs. Catherine the Great, who initially reversed Peter's decree, eventually re-affirmed it in 1764 and went still further by closing 569 out of 954 monasteries. In 1785 the Orthodox clergy did not receive a single seat in Catherine's legislative commission. By 1786, Catherine chose to simply exclude all religion and clerical studies programs from lay education. In 1797 the Holy Synod banned the election of priests who were now appointed by bishops.

The 18th century saw the rise of starchestvo under Paisius Velichkovsky and his disciples at the Optina Monastery. This marked a beginning of a significant spiritual revival in the Russian Church after a lengthy period of modernization.

Fin-de-siècle religious renaissance

During the final decades of the imperial order in Russia many educated Russians sought to return to the Church and revitalize their faith. No less evident were non-conformist paths of spiritual searching known as God-Seeking. Writers, artists, and intellectuals in large numbers were drawn to private prayer, mysticism, spiritualism, theosophy, and Eastern religions. A fascination with elemental feeling, with the unconscious and the mythic, proliferated along with visions of coming catastrophe and redemption. The visible forms of God-Seeking were extensive.

A series of 'Religious–Philosophical Meetings' were held in Saint Petersburg in 1901–1903, bringing together prominent intellectuals and clergy to explore together ways to reconcile the Church with the growing if undogmatic desire among the educated for spiritual meaning in life. Especially after 1905, various religious societies arose, though much of this religious upheaval was informal: circles and salons, séances, private prayer. Some clergy also sought to revitalize Orthodox faith, most famously the charismatic Father John of Kronstadt, who, until his death in 1908 (though his followers remained active long after), emphasized Christian living and sought to restore fervency and the presence of the miraculous in liturgical celebration.

In 1909, a sensation-creating volume of essays appeared under the title Vekhi (Landmarks or Signposts), authored by a group of leading left-wing intellectuals, mostly former Marxists, who bluntly repudiated the materialism and atheism that had dominated the thought of the intelligentsia for generations as leading inevitably to failure and moral disaster.

One sees a similarly renewed vigor and variety in religious life and spirituality among the lower classes, especially after the upheavals of 1905. Among the peasantry we see widespread interest in spiritual-ethical literature and non-conformist moral-spiritual movements, as well as an upsurge in pilgrimage and other devotions to sacred spaces and objects (especially icons).There were also persistent beliefs in the presence and power of the supernatural (apparitions, possession, walking-dead, demons, spirits, miracles, and magic). The lower classes also stressed the vitality of local "ecclesial communities" actively shaping their own ritual and spiritual lives, sometimes in the absence of clergy, and defining their own sacred places and forms of piety. Various heterodox beliefs, which the Orthodox establishment branded as 'sectarianism', also flourished, including both non-Orthodox Christian denominations, notably Baptists, and various forms of deviant popular Orthodoxy and mysticism.

Russian revolution

In 1914 in Russia, there were 55,173 Russian Orthodox churches and 29,593 chapels, 112,629 priests and deacons, 550 monasteries and 475 convents with a total of 95,259 monks and nuns. 

The year 1917 was a major turning point for the history of Russia, and also the Russian Orthodox Church. The Russian empire was dissolved and the Tsarist government – which had granted the Church numerous privileges – was overthrown. After a few months of political turmoil, the Bolsheviks took power in October 1917 and declared a separation of church and state. The government seized all church lands. Thus the Russian Orthodox Church found itself without official state backing for the first time in its history. One of the first decrees of the new Communist government (issued in January 1918) declared freedom of "religious and anti-religious propaganda". This led to a marked decline in the power and influence of the Church. The Church was also caught in the crossfire of the Russian Civil War that began later the same year, and many leaders of the Church supported what would ultimately turn out to be the losing side (the White movement).

According to Lenin, a communist regime cannot remain neutral on the question of religion but must show itself to be merciless towards it. There was no place for the church in Lenin's classless society.

Even before the end of the civil war and the establishment of the Soviet Union, the Russian Orthodox Church came under persecution of the Communist government. The Soviet government stood on a platform of militant atheism, viewing the church as a "counter-revolutionary" organization and an independent voice with a great influence in society. While the Soviet Union officially claimed religious toleration, in practice the government discouraged organized religion and did everything possible to remove religious influence from Soviet society.

The Russian Orthodox Church supported tsarist Russia, therefore creating another reason the Bolsheviks would attempt to diminish their influence on the Russian people and government.

Under Communist rule

"As early as August 1920 Lenin wrote to E. M. Skliansky, Vice-President of the Revolutionary Military Council: "We are surrounded by the greens (we pack it to them), we will move only about 10–20 versty and we will choke by hand the bourgeoisie, the clergy and the landowners. There will be an award of 100,000 rubles for each one hanged." He was speaking about the future actions in the countries neighboring Russia.

The Soviets' official religious stance was one of "religious freedom or tolerance", though the state established atheism as the only scientific truth (see also the Soviet or committee of the All-Union Society for the Dissemination of Scientific and Political Knowledge or Znanie which was until 1947 called The League of the Militant Godless). Criticism of atheism was strictly forbidden and sometimes led to imprisonment.

Some actions against Orthodox priests and believers along with execution included torture being sent to these prison camps and or labour camps or also mental hospitals. Many Orthodox (along with peoples of other faiths) were also subjected to psychological punishment or torture and mind control experimentation, in order to force them give up their religious convictions (see Piteşti prison).

In the first five years after the Bolshevik revolution, 28 bishops and 1,200 priests were executed.  This included people like the Grand Duchess Elizabeth Fyodorovna who was at this point a monastic. Along with her murder was Grand Duke Sergei Mikhailovich Romanov; the Princes Ioann Konstantinovich, Konstantin Konstantinovich, Igor Konstantinovich and Vladimir Pavlovich Paley; Grand Duke Sergei's secretary, Fyodor Remez; and Varvara Yakovleva, a sister from the Grand Duchess Elizabeth's convent. They were herded into the forest, pushed into an abandoned mineshaft and grenades were then hurled into the mineshaft.  Her remains were buried in Jerusalem, in the Church of Maria Magdalene.

Russian Religious Renaissance

In the early 1920s, Lenin expelled the leading Russian religious thinkers. Forced to leave Russia, these theologians settled in various European cities. The vessels which carried these intellectuals to Europe came to be known as the Philosophers' ships. With the establishment of the St. Sergius Orthodox Theological Institute in Paris in 1925, these émigré theologians began to teach and write about Orthodox theology in a distinctive new way. The Fin de siècle intellectual movement in theology and philosophy actually reached its full expression outside Russia in what is now called the Russian Religious Renaissance.

Theologian Paul L. Gavrilyuk explains that the Russian Religious Renaissance was an attempt to interpret all aspects of human existence: culture, politics, even economics, in Christian terms. This Renaissance was brought about by the generation of Nicholas Berdyaev, Sergius Bulgakov, Nicholas Lossky, and Lev Shestov.

Anti-religious campaign and persecution in the 1920s and 1930s

The sixth sector of the OGPU, led by Yevgeny Tuchkov, aggressively arrested and executed bishops, priests, and devout worshippers for refusing hand in church valuables. Some 20,000 people were executed just outside Butovo, including many clergy, ascetics and laymen.

The church survived underground, and Freeze argues that the persecution in some ways made it stronger:
Indeed, the party's anti-religious policy arguably had a certain salutary effect: if nothing else, it helped to expunge the clerical dead wood, those who served from convenience rather than conviction. More important, the Bolsheviks unwittingly helped to foster religious revival in the 1920s: by demolishing the institutional church and shifting the authority to the parish, they helped to empower parishioners, above all, religious activists. It was precisely because these non-clerical tserkovniki so aggressively propagated the faith and defended their church that they would become a prime target of repression in the 1930s.

The mass closure of churches continued until 1939, by which time there was only a few hundred left. According to the official data of the government Commission on Rehabilitation: in 1937 136,900 Orthodox clerics were arrested, 85,300 of them were shot dead; in 1938 28,300 arrested, 21,500 of them shot dead; in 1939 1,500 arrested, 900 of them shot dead; in 1940 5,100 arrested, 1,100 of them shot dead.

The Solovki Special Purpose Camp was established in the monastery on the Solovetsky Islands in the White Sea. Eight metropolitans, twenty archbishops, and forty-seven bishops of the Orthodox Church died there, along with tens of thousands of the laity. Of these, 95,000 were put to death, executed by firing squad. Father Pavel Florensky was one of the New-martyrs of this particular period as well as Metropolitan Joseph (Ivan Petrovykh).

Many thousands of victims of persecution were subsequently recognized in a special canon of saints known as the "new-martyrs and confessors of Russia".

Patriarch Tikhon

Patriarch Tikhon antagonized the communist government, further degrading relations.

The Soviet authorities sponsored I Renovationist (officially called II All-Russian Council) in Moscow from April 29 to May 8, 1923, which apart from confirming the decisions concerning changes in the canonical rules of ordinations and clerical marriage, put Patriarch Tikhon (then under house arrest, awaiting civil trial) on ecclesiastic trial in absentia, dethroned him, stripped him of his episcopacy, priesthood and monastic status.  The Council then resolved to abolish the Patriarchate altogether and to return to the "collegial" form of church government. Tikhon refused to recognize the authority of the Council and the validity of the "court" decision. The Council's decisions had no effect on the life of the Patriarchal or "Tikhonite" Church, which continued to exist, albeit on an illegal footing.

Metropolitan Sergius
When Tikhon died in 1925, the Soviet authorities forbade patriarchal elections to be held.

Patriarchal Locum Tenens (acting Patriarch) Metropolitan Sergius (Stragorodsky, 1887–1944), going against the opinion of a part of the Church's parishes, in 1927 issued an Appeal to the faithful, widely known as The Declaration of Metropolitan Sergius, which proclaimed loyalty towards the Soviet state and condemned political dissent within the Church. The Appeal made it clear that its purpose was "legalisation" of the Patriarchal Church's structures, namely The Temporary Patriarchal Synod. The legalisation had been granted by the authorities shortly thitherto. Moreover, he demanded pledges of loyalty to the Soviet state from all Russian Orthodox clergy abroad.

This, as well as the fact that his actions were seen by many as usurpation of the power that he was not entitled to, being a deputy of imprisoned Metropolitan Peter (Polyansky) (according to the XXXIV Apostolic canon), solidified the already existing split with the Russian Orthodox Church Outside of Russia abroad and provoked another split with the Russian True Orthodox Church (Russian Catacomb Church) within the Soviet Union.

World War II rapprochement
After Nazi Germany's attack on the Soviet Union in 1941, Joseph Stalin revived the Russian Orthodox Church to intensify patriotic support for the war effort.  On September 4, 1943, Metropolitans Sergius (Stragorodsky), Alexius (Simansky) and Nicholas (Yarushevich) were officially received by Soviet leader Joseph Stalin. They received permission to convene a council on September 8, 1943, that elected Sergius Patriarch of Moscow and all Rus'. The Moscow Theological Academy and Seminary which had been closed since 1918 was re-opened.

Postwar era

Between 1945 and 1959 the number of open churches reached 25,000.  By 1957 about 22,000 Russian Orthodox churches had become active. But in 1959 Nikita Khrushchev initiated his own campaign against the Russian Orthodox Church and forced the closure of about 12,000 churches. By 1985 fewer than 7,000 churches remained active.  It is estimated that 50,000 clergy were executed by the end of the Khrushchev era.  Members of the church hierarchy were jailed or forced out, their places taken by docile clergy, many of whom had ties with the KGB.

In the postwar era, having changed its political orientation, the Orthodox Church reviewed its traditional positions. It went on to approve the accomplishments of the socialist state, and it called on believers to participate in the international peace movement. Modernist tendencies grew stronger, even in the religious aspects of ideology and practice. For example, the church no longer glorified senseless suffering, which it once considered as a road of salvation.

Relations between the church and state improved considerably. For his work, Patriarch Pimen was awarded testimonials and personal medals by the Soviet Peace Fund (1969 and 1971) and the gold Fighter for Peace medal from the Soviet Peace Committee. His predecessor Patriarch Aleksy was awarded four Orders of the Red Banner of Labor and other medals of the USSR.

By 1987 the number of functioning churches in the Soviet Union stood at 6893 and the number of functioning monasteries to 18.

Citizens of the USSR were permitted to form religious societies for their religious needs if at least 20 believers reached the age of 18. Believers who composed an association performed religious rites, organized meetings for prayer, and other purposes connected to worship. They hired ministers and other persons to meet their needs, collected voluntary contributions in houses of worship for the support of their property. The Government granted the free use of houses of worship and other publicly owned property of the USSR. Russian Orthodox priests were trained at theological academies and seminaries

In the Soviet Union the charitable and social work formerly done by ecclesiastical authorities were regulated by the government. Church owned property was nationalized. Places of worship were legally viewed as state property which the government permitted the church to use.  After the advent of state funded universal education, the Church's influence on education declined. Outside of sermons during the celebration of the divine liturgy it was restricted from evangelizing.

Glasnost

A pivotal point in the history of the Russian Orthodox Church came in 1988 with the 1000th anniversary of the Baptism of Kievan Rus': Throughout the summer of that year, major government-supported celebrations took place in Moscow and other cities. The 1988 Local Council of the Russian Orthodox Church met in Zagorsk; many older churches and some monasteries were reopened. An implicit ban on religious propaganda on state TV was finally lifted. For the first time in the history of Soviet Union, people could see live transmissions of church services on television.

Post-Soviet recovery

The Russian Orthodox Church Outside Russia (also known as the Russian Orthodox Church Abroad), based in New York City, is a jurisdiction of the church which was separated from Moscow for several decades. The Russian Orthodox Church Abroad was formed in the 1920s by Russian communities outside Communist Russia who refused to recognize the authority of the Russian Orthodox Church, as they believed it had fallen under the influence of the Bolsheviks. Relations between the two churches began improving in the 1990s, and there was a formal reconciliation in 2007 through the Act of Canonical Communion with the Moscow Patriarchate This agreement made the Church Abroad a mostly self-governing branch of the Russian Orthodox Church.

In November 2013, a large group of Russian entrepreneurs, public figures and scientists called for defining a special role of Orthodoxy in the Constitution. The appeal has been submitted to the president, the two houses of the Russian Parliament and Russian regional parliaments. The petitioners say their address was the final document of the conference titled "The Triumph and Collapse of an Empire: Lessons from History". According to them "The state sovereignty of the Russian Federation is law. Our call is for backing up its spiritual sovereignty, too, by declaring the Orthodoxy's special role in the Russian Constitution".

Churches in America

After resuming communication with Moscow in the early 1960s, and being granted autocephaly in 1970, the Metropolia became known as the Orthodox Church in America.

On 17 May 2007, the Russian Orthodox Church Outside Russia signed the Act of Canonical Communion with the Moscow Patriarchate. According to the provisions of the Act, the Moscow Patriarchate guarantees that ROCOR will maintain its independent hierarchy, continuing to be "an indissoluble, self-governing part of the Local Russian Orthodox Church", the only change being that when she elects a new First Hierarch, his election must be confirmed by the Patriarch of Moscow. In turn, ROCOR recognizes the Patriarch of Moscow as the head of the entire Russian Orthodox Church.

See also
 History of Eastern Christianity
 History of the Eastern Orthodox Church
 History of Christianity in Ukraine
 Russian Orthodox Church Outside Russia
 Orthodox Church in America

References

Further reading
 Billington, James H. The Icon and the Axe: An Interpretative History of Russian Culture (1970)
 Bremer, Thomas. Cross and Kremlin: A Brief History of the Orthodox Church in Russia (2013)
 Cracraft, James. The Church Reform of Peter the Great (1971)
 Ellis, Jane. The Russian Orthodox Church: A Contemporary History (1988)
 Freeze, Gregory L. "Handmaiden of the state? The church in Imperial Russia reconsidered". Journal of Ecclesiastical History 36#1 (1985): 82–102.
 Freeze, Gregory L. "Subversive piety: Religion and the political crisis in late Imperial Russia". Journal of Modern History (1996): 308–50. in JSTOR
 Freeze, Gregory L. "The Orthodox Church and Serfdom in Prereform Russia". Slavic Review (1989): 361–87. in JSTOR
 Freeze, Gregory L. "Social Mobility and the Russian Parish Clergy in the Eighteenth Century". Slavic Review (1974): 641–62. in JSTOR
 Freeze, Gregory L. The Parish Clergy in Nineteenth-Century Russia: Crisis, Reform, Counter-Reform  (1983)
 Freeze, Gregory L. "A case of stunted Anticlericalism: Clergy and Society in Imperial Russia". European History Quarterly 13#.2 (1983): 177–200.
 Freeze, Gregory L. Russian Levites: Parish Clergy in the Eighteenth Century (1977)
 Garrard, John and Carol Garrard. Russian Orthodoxy Resurgent: Faith and Power in the New Russia (2008)
 Gruber, Isaiah. Orthodox Russia in Crisis: Church and Nation in the Time of Troubles (2012); 17th century
 Hughes, Lindsey. Russia in the Age of Peter the Great (1998) pp. 332–56
 Kizenko, Nadieszda. A Prodigal Saint: Father John of Kronstadt and the Russian People (2000) This highly influential holy man lived 1829–1908.
 Kozelsky, Mara. Christianizing Crimea: Shaping Sacred Space in the Russian Empire and Beyond (2010).
 de Madariaga, Isabel. Russia in the Age of Catherine the Great (1981) pp. 111–22
 Mrowczynski-Van Allen, Artur, ed. Apology of Culture: Religion and Culture in Russian Thought (2015)
 Plamper, Jan. "The Russian Orthodox Episcopate, 1721–1917: a Prosopography". Journal of Social History 34.1 (2000): 5–34. in JSTOR; online
 Pipes, Richard. Russia under the Old Regime (2nd ed. 1976) ch 9
 Pospielovsky, Dimitry.  The Orthodox Church in the History of Russia  (St Vladimir's Press, 1998) 
 Richters, Katja. The Post-Soviet Russian Orthodox Church: Politics, Culture and Greater Russia (2014)
 Strickland, John. The Making of Holy Russia: The Orthodox Church and Russian Nationalism Before the Revolution (2013)
 Shubin, Daniel H. History of Russian Christianity, in 4 volumes: ; ; ;

Historiography
 Freeze, Gregory L. "Recent Scholarship on Russian Orthodoxy: A Critique". Kritika: Explorations in Russian and Eurasian History 2#2 (2008): 269–78. online

 
988 establishments
Eastern Orthodoxy in Europe